Sayyid ˈAbdur-Rahmān al-Bukhāri (1920 – 1 February 2014), known as Ullal Thangal and honoured with the title Tājul Ulamā , was an Indian Islamic scholar. He was the President of Samastha, Jamia Sa-adiya Arabic College, Principal of the Sayyid Madani Arabic College, Ullal, and the Qazi of Ullal.

He was a prominent member of the Samastha until the split of the Sunnis in 1989 and the Samastha's AP faction thereafter.

His resting place is in Ettikulam, Kannur, Kerala.

See also
 Sheikh Abubakr Ahmad

References

External links 
 Kerala CM leads Muslims to pay homage to scholar at Arab News
 As Spiritual Light Fades, South Indian Muslims Face Many Woes at islamicpluralism.org

1920 births
2014 deaths
Sunni Muslim scholars of Islam
Islam in Kerala
People from Kozhikode district
Kerala Sunni-Shafi'i scholars